Eduardo Auyón, (born in Canton, China in 1935 – dead in Mexicali, Baja California on October 8, 2015) was an artist and cultural promoter. He moved to Mexicali, Mexico in the 1960s. He was a professor at Escuela de Bellas Artes de Mexicali.

He published "Los chinos en Baja California. Ayer y hoy" (1971), and "El dragón en el desierto. Los pioneros chinos en Mexicali" (1991).

References

External links
 A caballo entre México y China

Chinese emigrants to Mexico
Mexican people of Chinese descent
Mexican artists
Artists from Baja California
People from Mexicali
Living people
1935 births